Eira is a neighborhood in Helsinki, the capital of Finland.

History

The district dates back to the early 20th century and received its name after Eira Hospital in the neighboring district of Ullanlinna, which in turn took its name from Eira Hospital in Stockholm, which was named after Eir, the old Scandinavian goddess of healing.

Eira is located south from the city centre. The neighbourhood has some of the most expensive and sought-after old apartments in Helsinki, built in jugend style. Many foreign embassies and high-class restaurants are situated in Eira and the neighbouring district of Kaivopuisto.

Eira also appears in the movie Calamari Union directed by Aki Kaurismäki. In the movie the area of Eira symbolizes wealth and well-being, which the characters are trying to achieve by moving from Kallio to Eira.

Notable residents
Jussi Halla-aho (born 1971), Finnish politician

Diplomatic districts
Neighbourhoods of Helsinki
Ullanlinna district